Metaphos is a genus of sea snails, marine gastropod mollusks in the family Nassariidae.

Species

Species within the genus Metaphos include:
 Metaphos articulatus (Hinds, 1844)
 Metaphos cocosensis (Dall, 1896)
 Metaphos dejanira (Dall, 1919)
 Metaphos gaudens (Hinds, 1844)
 Metaphos laevigatus (A. Adams, 1851)
 Metaphos minusculus (Dall, 1917)

References

 Landau B., Silva C.M. da & Heitz A. (2016). Systematics of the gastropods of the Lower–Middle Miocene Cantaure Formation, Paraguaná Formation, Paraguaná peninsula, Venezuela. Bulletins of American Paleontology. 389-390: 1-581.

External links
  Galindo, L. A.; Puillandre, N.; Utge, J.; Lozouet, P.; Bouchet, P. (2016). The phylogeny and systematics of the Nassariidae revisited (Gastropoda, Buccinoidea). Molecular Phylogenetics and Evolution. 99: 337-353

Nassariidae
Gastropod genera